Lucius Jeremiah Gartrell (January 7, 1821 – April 7, 1891) was an American politician and lawyer, as well as general in the Confederate States Army during the American Civil War.

Early life and education 
Gartrell was born near Washington, Georgia to Joseph Gartrell, Jr. and Eliza Boswell Gartrell. He attended Randolph-Macon College, and Franklin College (now known as the Franklin College of Arts and Sciences), the founding school of the University of Georgia in Athens. Gartrell passed the state bar in 1842 and began the practice of law in Washington.

Public office 
Gartrell served as the solicitor general of the northern judicial circuit from 1843 until 1847 when he was elected to the Georgia House of Representatives. He was subsequently elected to the first of two consecutive terms in U.S. House of Representatives in 1856.

Confederate service 
He resigned from his second term in 1861 to form the Seventh Regiment of the Georgia Volunteer Infantry in the Confederate army during the Civil War. In 1862, Gartrell was elected to the Confederate Congress and served in that capacity until 1864. In 1864, he was appointed as a brigadier general in the Confederate forces.

Personal life 
Gartrell married twice. First to  Olivia Gideon (1823-1854). The couple had two sons, Henry Clay Gartrell (1845-1861), and Joseph Erasmus Gartrell (1852-1886). After the death of his first wife, Gartrell married Antoinette Phoebe Burke (1834-1882). They had seven children, Lizzie Gartrell Baird (1856-1898), Vannie Gartrell Phinizy (1858-1887), Carrie Gartrell Blount (1861-1947), Lucy Gartrell Magnus (1864-1936), Ida-May Gartrell Hartridge (1866-1892), Alice Gartrell Hay (1870–1910), and Lucius Jeremiah Gartrell, Jr. (1879-1944).

Later years 
After the war, Gartrell served as a member of the State constitutional convention in 1877. He also ran for governor in 1882 but lost to Alexander Stephens. Gartrell died in Atlanta, Georgia, in 1891 and was buried in that city's Oakland Cemetery.

See also

List of American Civil War generals (Confederate)

References

Further reading
 Eicher, John H., and David J. Eicher, Civil War High Commands. Stanford: Stanford University Press, 2001. .
 Sifakis, Stewart. Who Was Who in the Civil War. New York: Facts On File, 1988. .
 Warner, Ezra J. Generals in Gray: Lives of the Confederate Commanders. Baton Rouge: Louisiana State University Press, 1959. .

1821 births
1891 deaths
People from Washington, Georgia
People of Georgia (U.S. state) in the American Civil War
Democratic Party members of the Georgia House of Representatives
Members of the Confederate House of Representatives from Georgia (U.S. state)
Confederate States Army brigadier generals
Georgia (U.S. state) lawyers
University of Georgia people
Democratic Party members of the United States House of Representatives from Georgia (U.S. state)
American slave owners
19th-century American politicians
Burials at Oakland Cemetery (Atlanta)
19th-century American lawyers